Dušan Stević (born 22 January 1971) is a Serbian former professional basketball player.

College career 
Stević played college basketball at Kirkwood Community College, Oklahoma City, and Armstrong State.

Professional career 
A power forward and center, Stević played for Crvena zvezda, Hemofarm, Krka, Hopsi Polzela, Lugano Tigers, Paris Basket Racing, Nantes, Erdemirspor, Anibal Zahle, APOEL, Al Riyadi Club Beirut, Al-Hilal Riyadh, and Heyat Shahrekord. He retired as a player with Shahrekord in 2009.

Career achievements
 Arab Club Championship champion: 1  (with Al Riyadi Club Beirut: 2005–06)
 Swiss Basketball League champion: 3  (with Lugano Tigers: 1999–00, 2000–01, 2001–02)
 Lebanese Basketball League champion: 1  (with Al Riyadi Club Beirut: 2005–06)
 Swiss Cup winner: 1  (with Lugano Tigers: 2000–01)
 Lebanese Cup winner: 1  (with Al Riyadi Club Beirut: 2005–06)

References

External links
 Dusan Stevic at asia-basket.com
 Dusan Stevic at realgm.com
 Dusan Stevic at euroleague.net
 Dusan Stevic at proballers.com
 Dusan Stevic at ffbb.com

1971 births
Living people
APOEL B.C. players
Al Riyadi Club Beirut basketball players
Centers (basketball)
Erdemirspor players
Hermine Nantes Basket players
Junior college men's basketball players in the United States
Lugano Tigers players
KD Hopsi Polzela players
KK Crvena zvezda players
KK Krka players
KK Hemofarm players
Oklahoma City Stars men's basketball players
Paris Racing Basket players
People from Benghazi
Power forwards (basketball)
Serbian expatriate basketball people in Cyprus
Serbian expatriate basketball people in France
Serbian expatriate basketball people in Iran
Serbian expatriate basketball people in Lebanon
Serbian expatriate basketball people in Saudi Arabia
Serbian expatriate basketball people in Slovenia
Serbian expatriate basketball people in Switzerland
Serbian expatriate basketball people in the United States
Serbian expatriate basketball people in Turkey
Serbian men's basketball players
Yoga teachers
Yugoslav men's basketball players